George H. Roderick (February 22, 1900 – February 19, 1982) was an official in the United States Department of the Army during the Eisenhower Administration.

Biography
Roderick was educated at the University of Michigan, where he wrote the music for the 1920 college musical.

In the 1950s, Roderick was active in the Rotary Club in Grand Rapids, Michigan.

In 1954, President Dwight D. Eisenhower appointed Roderick Assistant Secretary of the Army (Financial Management and Comptroller), with Roderick serving in this post from February 9, 1954, until August 25, 1954.  Eisenhower then named Roderick Assistant Secretary of the Army (Civil-Military Affairs), and Roderick held this office from August 26, 1954, until February 29, 1957.  In 1957, Roderick resumed his former office of Assistant Secretary of the Army (Financial Management and Comptroller), holding this office from March 1, 1957, until January 20, 1961.

References

United States Army civilians
1982 deaths
University of Michigan alumni
1900 births